Briggs Hill is a conspicuous ice-free hill,  high, standing on the south side of Ferrar Glacier between Descent Glacier and Overflow Glacier in Victoria Land. It was charted by the British Antarctic Expedition, 1910–13, under Scott, and named by the Advisory Committee on Antarctic Names for Raymond S. Briggs, United States Antarctic Research Program meteorologist at McMurdo Station in 1962, and station scientific leader there in 1963.

References
 

Hills of Victoria Land
Scott Coast